The Wizard's Dilemma is the fifth book in the Young Wizards series by Diane Duane. It is the sequel to A Wizard Abroad.

Plot summary
Nita and Kit start to fight about the solution to the pollution in Jones Inlet, leading Nita to start to work on her own for a while. In the meantime, Nita's mother falls ill and is taken to the hospital with a brain tumor.

Meanwhile, Kit finds out that his dog, Ponch, is able to create universes out of nothing, bringing in a lot of research possibilities where they can explore. Nita begins to practice with kernels - magical "software" that describes and reflects the surrounding area- in order to try to save her mother's life.

While practicing, Nita meets a wizard named Pralaya who might be able to join her in saving her mother's life.  She then discovers that the wizard may be overshadowed by the Lone Power, making it a dangerous prospect for them to work together. She discusses it with Kit, who decides to help her as well.

While her mother is in surgery, Nita enters her body with Pralaya and begins to search for the kernel in order to kill the cancer, leaving Kit behind. Kit, using the universes Ponch creates, is able to also enter Mrs. Callahan's body to aid Nita and her mother. He helps her undo the deal she was in the process of making with the Lone Power for her mother's life, but she is still unable to eliminate all of the cancer. As the Lone Power is gloating in his anticipated victory, Nita's mother is able to take control of the kernel and defeat the Lone Power. She realizes that if she were to cure herself, she would be starting down a path at the end of which nothing would matter to her except extending her life, so she chooses to live out what life is left to her in love.

External links 
 Young Wizards Website

2001 American novels
Young adult fantasy novels
American young adult novels
2001 children's books